Michaela Mlejnková (born ) is a Czech volleyball player, playing as an outside-spiker. She is part of the Czech Republic women's national volleyball team.

She participated in the 2014 FIVB Volleyball World Grand Prix, and 2015 FIVB Volleyball World Grand Prix, and 2016 FIVB Volleyball World Grand Prix.

She competed at the 2015 Women's European Volleyball Championship. and 2019 Women's European Volleyball League, winning a gold medal.

On club level she plays for Turkish SigortaShop.

References

External links

1996 births
Living people
Czech women's volleyball players
Place of birth missing (living people)
Outside hitters